In astronomy, Calvera is a nickname —based on the villain in the 1960 film The Magnificent Seven— of an X-ray source known as 1RXS J141256.0+792204 in the ROSAT All-Sky Survey Bright Source Catalog (RASS/BSC).  It lies in the constellation Ursa Minor and is identified as an isolated neutron star.  It is one of the closest of its kind to Earth. There is a ring of radio emission almost a degree in diameter, offset about 4′.9 from Calvera itself, which is possibly its supernova remnant.

The object is so-named because the seven previously known isolated neutron stars are known collectively as 'The Magnificent Seven'.

References

External links
 Universe Today, Closest Neutron Star Discovered 
Pennsylvania State University. 

Neutron stars
Ursa Minor (constellation)
ROSAT objects